Thomas Farnham (by 1527–1562) was an English politician.

He was a Member (MP) of the Parliament of England for Leicester in October 1553, East Grinstead in 1558, and Gatton in 1559.

References

1562 deaths
Year of birth uncertain
English MPs 1553 (Mary I)
English MPs 1558
English MPs 1559